This is a list of battlecruisers of World War II. 
A battlecruiser, or battle cruiser, was a capital ship built in the first half of the 20th century. They were similar in size, cost, and carried similar armament to battleships, but they generally carried less armour to obtain faster speeds. The first battlecruisers were designed in the United Kingdom, in the first decade of the century, as a development of the armoured cruiser, at the same time as the dreadnought succeeded the pre-dreadnought battleship. The original aim of the battlecruiser was to hunt down slower, older armoured cruisers and destroy them with heavy gunfire. However, as more and more battlecruisers were built, they increasingly became used alongside the better-protected battleships.

Battlecruisers served in the navies of Britain, Germany, the Ottoman Empire, Australia and Japan during World War I, most notably at the Battle of the Falkland Islands and in the several raids and skirmishes in the North Sea which culminated in a pitched fleet battle, the Battle of Jutland. British battlecruisers, in particular, suffered heavy losses at Jutland, which modern research has revealed was due to dangerous ammunition handling practises rather than the weak armour usually attributed as the weakness. By the end of the war, capital ship design had developed with battleships becoming faster and battlecruisers becoming more heavily armoured, blurring the distinction between a battlecruiser and a fast battleship. The Washington Naval Treaty, which limited capital ship construction from 1922 onwards, treated battleships and battlecruisers identically, and the new generation of battlecruisers planned was scrapped under the terms of the treaty.

From the 1930s on, only the Royal Navy continued to use 'battlecruiser' as a classification for the World War I-era capital ships that remained in the fleet; while Japan's battlecruisers remained in service, they had been significantly reconstructed and were re-rated as full-fledged battleships.

Battlecruisers were put into action again during World War II, and only one survived to the end. There was also renewed interest in large "cruiser-killer" type warships, but few were ever begun, as construction of battleships and battlecruisers were curtailed in favor of more-needed convoy escorts, aircraft carriers, and cargo ships.

The List of ships of World War II contains major military vessels of the war, arranged alphabetically and by type. The list includes armed vessels that served during the war and in the immediate aftermath, inclusive of localized ongoing combat operations, garrison surrenders, post-surrender occupation, colony re-occupation, troop  and prisoner repatriation, to the end of 1945. For smaller vessels, see also List of World War II ships of less than 1000 tons. Some uncompleted Axis ships are included, out of historic interest. Ships are designated to the country under which they operated for the longest period of the Second World War, regardless of where they were built or previous service history.

References

Bibliography
 

 
Battlecruisers
World War II